Stadtlohn is a city in western Münsterland in the northwest of North Rhine-Westphalia, and is a district town of the Borken administrative district. The city had a population of 20,746 inhabitants as of 2020. The River Berkel flows through the city on its way to the Netherlands.

Geography

Division of the town
Stadtlohn consists of 9 districts:
 Stadtlohn
Almsick
 Büren
 Estern
 Hengeler
 Hordt
 Hundewick
 Wendfeld
 Wenningfeld

History
The town was founded as Lohn by Liudger, the first Bishop of Münster about the year 800. About 985 Gescher was split from Lohn, which in turn (1231) split into Südlohn (literally "South-Lohn") and Nordlohn (literally "North-Lohn"). The name Stadtlohn (literally "Town-Lohn") is first mentioned in 1389 after the small town Nordlohn was secured by a moat, a defensive wall and gates and gained the town rights. About 1406 Stadtlohn was burned down by Count Heinrich I of Solms-Ottenstein because he feuded with the bishop of Münster. Bishop Heinrich III of Münster  verified its town rights in 1491.

In 1584 Stadtlohn was pillaged by the troops of Duke Ernest of Bavaria and again in 1588 by Dutch soldiers. In 1591 Spanish soldiers attacked the town. For a few months of 1598 Spanish troops were stationed in the town during the Eighty Years' War. In 1611 a serious fire destroyed 225 of 235 houses.

On August 6, 1623 during the Thirty Years' War the Battle of Stadtlohn (German: Schlacht im Lohner Brook) saw Johan Tzerclaes, Count of Tilly's imperial troops victorious over Duke Christian of Brunswick's men. About 6.000 soldiers died that day. In 1742 regular pilgrimages started to a statue of Mary in a small chapel in Stadtlohn from various towns in the Münsterland. The adoration of the Virgin Mary ended in 1886 when the statue was stolen from the Hilgenbergchapel.

In World War II, Stadtlohn was hit by bombs as early as 1940 and 1942, but the damage was limited. In March 1945, however, Stadtlohn was affected by two massive allied airstrikes that destroyed 86% of the town. About 600 inhabitants lost their lives. On March 31, 1945 British forces marched into the town.

Sights
 Former Jewish Cemetery in the town center. Close by there is a sightworthy commemorative plaque in Hagenstrasse street reminding on the synagogue which was destroyed in 1938.
 Former pilgrimage chapel Marienkapelle on Hilgenberg hill.
 Saint Otger Church, rebuilt after the war.
 Town Hall, destroyed in 1945 and rebuilt in 1953.
 Hünenburg
 Dicke Eiche

Museums
 Railroadmuseum Stadtlohn
 SIKU Toy-car Museum

Sports clubs
Stadtlohn has 2 sports clubs. The SUS Stadtlohn has the most members (approx. 3700 members), followed by the DJK Eintracht Stadtlohn.

International relations

Stadtlohn is twinned with:
  Weerselo, Netherlands
  San Vito al Tagliamento, Italy
  Altlandsberg, Germany

Notable people
 Ingrid Laubrock (born 1970), jazz musician
 Bernhard Rothmann (1495–after 1535), reformer and an Anabaptist leader

References

External links

  
 Detailed map of Stadtlohn, including pictures 

 
Towns in North Rhine-Westphalia
Borken (district)
Holocaust locations in Germany